La Voltige (also known as Horse Trick Riders) is an 1895 French short black-and-white silent documentary film directed and produced by Louis Lumière. It was filmed in Lyon, Rhône, Rhône-Alpes, France. Given its age, this short film is available to freely download from the Internet.

The film formed part of the first commercial presentation of the Lumière Cinématographe on December 28, 1895 at the Salon Indien, Grand Café, 14 Boulevard des Capuchins, Paris.

Production
As with all early Lumière movies, this film was made in a 35 mm format with an aspect ratio of 1.33:1. It was filmed by means of the Cinématographe, an all-in-one camera, which also serves as a film projector and developer.

Plot

Three men and a horse stand in a field. The first man in white holds the reins of the horse, the second man in black stands observing while the third man attempts to mount the horse. After six unsuccessful attempts he is finally able to seat himself and is set to ride off sidesaddle.

References

External links
 Complete video at The Lumiere Institute (requires QuickTime)
 
 La Voltige on YouTube

1895 films
French black-and-white films
French silent short films
Films directed by Auguste and Louis Lumière
1890s short documentary films
Black-and-white documentary films
French short documentary films
1890s French films